Sofina, Société Financière de Transports et d'Entreprises Industrielles, is a Belgian holding company, headquartered in Brussels with offices in Singapore. As part of the Bel20 index, it is one of the twenty largest capitalisation in Belgium. The company invests in several industrial sectors such as telecommunication (7%), portfolio companies, banks and insurance (6%), private equity (6%), services within the company (18%), consumer goods (31%), energy (6%), food distribution (8%) and various other sectors (10%). Geographically, Sofina has investments located in Belgium, France, Luxembourg, the Netherlands, the United Kingdom, India and North America.

History 
The company was founded in 1898. It was led from 1905 until 1955 by the Belgian-American engineer of German origin Dannie Heineman (1872-1962). Historically, the company owned the Anglo-Argentine Tramways Company, which was one of the largest tram operators in the world at the time. From 1955 on, the current family shareholders  started to invest. Yves Boël is appointed Director in 1956. In 1964, the Boël family took control together with Société Générale de Belgique.

Governance, management and shareholder structure

Governance and Management 
 Chairman of the board:  David Verey since 2014 (took over from Richard Goblet d'Alviella)
Management: Harold Boël, chief executive officer, Xavier Coirbay,  Wauthier De Bassompierre, Francois Gillet. Former Managers : Jean-Luc Reginster,  former general counsel, former secretary; Marc Speeckaert, former managing director; Marc Van Cauwenberghe, former deputy managing director.

Shareholder structure 
The majority of the shares are held by the Boël family. The remaining shares are listed on Euronext Brussels and Sofina is part of the Bel 20 index.

Notable investments 

 Bira 91
 Byju's
 Cambridge Associates
 Cognita
 Colruyt
 Danone
 Eurazeo
 Flipkart (made an exit in 2018)
 Myntra
 Pine Labs
 Richemont
 Sequoia Capital
 SES S.A.
 Suez S.A.
 Typeform (service)

See also 
 Groupe Bruxelles Lambert

References

External links
 
 Sofina news
 For the history and historical archives of the company, see Association pour la Valorisation des Archives d'Entreprises
 

Financial services companies of Belgium
Companies based in Brussels
Companies listed on Euronext Brussels